DR TV is an internet streaming catch-up television service for people in Denmark, made by Danish Broadcasting Corporation (DR). The service is available on a wide range of devices, including mobile phones and tablets, personal computers, and smart televisions.

The service was formerly called DR Nu, but was relaunched on 2 June 2014 as DR TV.

Television platforms

HbbTV
DR TV is available as a HbbTV service on all DR digital TV channels.

Apple TV
On 30 October 2015 DR TV became available on the 4th generation of Apple TV.

Panasonic Smart TV
Panasonic added DR TV on 17 March 2017 as an app on their Smart TV sets from 2014 to 2017.

Consoles

PlayStation 3, 4
On 30 November 2015 DR TV was released as an app on PlayStation 3 and 4.

References

External links 

 
Television in Denmark